Sebastian Barnes (born 18 November 1976) is a Ghanaian former footballer who played at both professional and international levels as a midfielder.

Career

Club career
Barnes began his career with Hearts of Oak, before playing for top-level German teams Bayer 04 Leverkusen and 1. FSV Mainz 05. In 1997, Barnes played for the Orlando Sundogs in the USISL A-League. After leaving Mainz in 1998, Barnes played for a number of lower league German clubs, including VfL Hamm/Sieg and SF Neitersen.

International career
After representing Ghana at the FIFA U-17 World Championship in both 1991 and 1993, Barnes earned one cap for the senior team in 1994.

Honours
Ghana U17
 FIFA U-17 World Cup: 1991

References

1976 births
Living people
Ghanaian footballers
Ghanaian expatriate footballers
Ghana international footballers
Orlando Sundogs players
Bayer 04 Leverkusen players
1. FSV Mainz 05 players
A-League (1995–2004) players
2. Bundesliga players
Association football midfielders